Open Source Day is an international conference gathering fans of open solutions from Central and Eastern Europe. Mission of the event is to introduce open source solutions to Polish public and business institutions and popularize it as a secure, efficient, cost saving alternative to proprietary software. The conference has taken place in Warsaw since its beginning in 2007. Participants are mainly managers, developers, technical officers of public, banking, and insurance industries.

The conference has become a platform for exchanging experience, contacts and use cases of open source solutions in fields of: virtualization, cloud computing, database, big data, Information security.

Promotion of Open Source software 
Founders of the conference believe that by making open software popular they might initialize local communities as well as give start to small businesses in Poland which would provide support and develop open source solutions locally. Due to its role in promoting Open Source software in wider business and public applications, the Open Source Day Conference won support from public administration and were operated under the auspices of: Ministry of Education, Ministry of Administration and Digitization, Ministry of Economy and European Commission as well.

History 

Open Source Day was launched in 2007 by a handful of open source enthusiasts. They wanted to inform the public about the opportunities open software provides for market. Initial event drew only a moderate number of participants. Since then however each consecutive edition the event has grown in scope of subjects as well as the size of auditorium.

Open Source Day 2008 

The first full-fledged conference of Open Source Day took place on 9 April in Radisson SAS Hotel, Warsaw. Seven sessions were organized on different open source successful implementations in public administration: French project Copernic, city administration of Vienna and Swedish Police. Technical presentation were dealing with open source project: Xen, SELinux (Security Enhanced Linux), Metamatrix and SOA.

Open Source Day 2009 

The 2nd Open Source Day Conference took place on 6 May 2009 in the Radisson Blu Sobieski Hotel in Warsaw. 350 attendees participated. The event was supported by main technological partners Red Hat and IBM. Technical sessions covered: enterprise-class Linux distributions, virtualization, application servers and SOA platforms as well.

Open Source Day 2010 

The 3rd Open Source Day Conference came about on 12 May 2010 in the Palace of Culture and Science in Warsaw. The event gathered 400 guests and was supported by 12 technology vendors and 5 media partners. Polish Deputy Prime Minister Waldemar Pawlak had an opening keynote focusing on the major impact of Open Source on the IT market as a competitive alternative to proprietary solutions and reiterating an opportunity for the Polish IT professionals in deepening its participation in the world-wide IT revolution. Open Source trends were discussed from the point of view of Red Hat by its Vice President Werner Knoblich. During consecutive sessions latest updates about Open Source technologies were presented: middleware: JBoss, RDBMS: PostgreSQL/EnterpriseDB and MySQL as well as Alfresco (software) and Zimbra.

Open Source Day 2011 

The 4th Open Source Day Conference followed on 22 March 2011 in the Palace of Culture and Science in Warsaw. 500-strong audience arrived. The organization of the event was a performed with the help of 11 technology vendors and service providers as well as 6 media partners. The conference was under the auspices of Ministry of Education. Opening keynotes were provided by Red Hat, EnterpriseDB and Zarafa Vice Presidents. Technical sessions presented latest news from the area of OS Linux, databases, ESB, scalability, monitoring and IT security.

Open Source Day 2012 

The 5th Open Source Day Conference took place on 8 May 2012 once again in the Palace of Culture and Science. More than 500 guests attended while 14 technology partners provided support to make the event happen. The conference performed under the auspices of the  European Commission and Ministry of Administration and Digitization. Opening keynotes were introduced by the representatives of:  European Commission, Hewlett Packard, Red Hat and Linux Polska. Technical sessions focused that year on: Enterprise Content Management. It was the first time Big data aspects were discussed, especially in terms of storage capabilities, distributed processing and caching and data virtualization.

Open Source Day 2013 

The 6th Open Source Day Conference happened on 14 May 2013 this time in the Sheraton Warszawa hotel. 600 audience participated on-site while 1500 watched the event on-line. 9 technology partners supported the event while 5 media partners covered the proceedings. Polish Ministry of Administration and Digitization offered official patronage for the conference. The opening keynote was performed by Michał Boni, Minister of Administration and Digitization and covered the ever growing need for open standards and the opportunities Open Source is providing for Polish IT professionals and entrepreneurs.

Open Source Day 2014 

The 7th edition of the conference was a 2-day event on 13–14 May 2014 in Marriott Warszawa Hotel. 20 IT vendors and service providers help in organization, providing financing and content while 10 media partners offer news coverage.

The agenda covers 29 keynotes and lectures, 1 panel discussion and 6 bring your own device (BYOD) workshops.

More than 700 attendees participated while 3000 watched the proceedings online.

Open Source Day 2015 

The 8th edition of the conference was held on 23 April 2015 in the Marriott Warsaw. The conference will be performed under the auspices of the  Polish Ministry of Administration and Digitization. 16 IT vendors helped in the organization of the event, providing financing and content, while 17 media partners provided news coverage. The agenda covered 17 keynotes and lectures as well as a discussion panel. Key topics of this edition were: Cloud, IT Infrastructure and IT Security.

Open Source Day 2016 
The 9th edition of the conference was held on 26 April 2016 in the Marriott Warsaw.

Open Source Day 2017 
The 10th edition of the conference was held on 17 May 2017 in the Marriott Warsaw.

Open Source Day 2018 
The 11th edition of the conference was held on 23 May 2018 in the Marriott Warsaw.

See also 
 List of free-software events

References

External links 
 Official web site of the Open Source Day Conference

Computer-related events
Computer conferences
Free-software events
Linux conferences
Recurring events established in 2007
2007 establishments in Poland
Free-software conferences